The Time Bind is a book by sociologist Arlie Russell Hochschild in 1997, The Time Bind: When Work Becomes Home and Home Becomes Work. The book refers to the blurring distinction between work and home social environments.

Hochschild found in her research that although most working parents, particularly mothers, said "family comes first", few of them considered adjusting their long working hours, even when their workplaces offered flextime, parental leave, remote work, or other "family friendly" policies. She concluded that the roles of home and work had reversed: work had become more attractive, offering a sense of belonging, while home had grown more stressful, becoming a dreaded place with too many demands.

See also
 Double burden
 Work–family balance in the United States
 Work–family conflict
 Work–life balance

References
  Google Print

Family
Sociological terminology